Chrysemosa is a genus of green lacewings in the family Chrysopidae. They are distinguished from related genera based on male genital structures. The small and distinctive C. jeanneli is a commonly encountered species in orchards, fields and gardens of southern Africa.

Species 

 Chrysemosa andresi (Navas, 1915)
 Chrysemosa commixta (Tjeder, 1966)
 Chrysemosa jeanneli (Navás, 1914)
 Chrysemosa laristana (Hölzel, [1982])
 Chrysemosa mosconica (Navás, [1931])
 Chrysemosa parva (Tjeder, 1966)
 Chrysemosa piresi (Hölzel & Ohm, 1982)
 Chrysemosa senegalensis Hölzel et al., 1994
 Chrysemosa sodomensis (Hölzel, [1982])
 Chrysemosa stigmata (Navás, 1936)
 Chrysemosa umbralis (Navas, 1933)

References

 Mansell, M.W. Green Lacewings of South Africa: Chrysemosa, checklist

External links
 
 

Chrysopidae